Dada Jazz was a Yugoslav Dadaist single issue publication published in Zagreb in September 1922 and edited by Dragan Aleksić. Aleksić published Dada Tank as a response to Branko Ve Poljanski and his brother Ljubomir Micić's anti-Dada publication Dada-Jok from May 1922. Although Dada Jazz has been characterized as a mere footnote to Dada Tank, it was in fact intended as a "Dada anthology", analogous to Richard Huelsenbeck's Dada Almanach.

Background 
After falling out with the representative of Dada in Yugoslavia, Dragan Aleksić, the Zenitists Branko Ve Poljanski and Ljubomir Micić published an anti-Dada single issue publication in May 1922 called Dada-Jok. Through a skillful, reflexive parody of the movement, the editor Poljanski sought to expose Dada's limits as an artistic and spiritual current, proposing Zenitism in its stead. As a response, Aleksić published two single-issue pamphlets of his own – Dada Tank in June and Dada Jazz in September 1922.

Contents 
Dada Jazz reprinted Dragan Aleksić's 1921 essay "Dadaism" from Zenit, subtly reminding people of his seniority over Ljubomir Micić. It included a major text by Tristan Tzara, titled "Manifeste de Monsieur Aa, l'antiphilosophe" (Manifesto of Mr Aa the Antiphilosoper), as well as Tzara's short verse "Colonial Syllogism", alongside a poem by Aleksić. On the centerfold two pages was printed the typographic picture-poem "Smaknu" (Execution), a translation into Serbo-Croatian of a Hungarian poem by Ádám Csont that had originally appeared, like Erwin Enders's "Greek Fire" published in Dada Tank, in the May 1922 issue of the Vienna-based publication MA. Tzara's work in Dada Jazz was published in its original French.

Although Dada Jazz has been characterized as a mere footnote to Dada Tank, it was in fact a very different project. Its cover designated it to be a "Dada anthology", analogous to Richard Huelsenbeck's Dada Almanach, which Aleksić had translated and excerpted in Dada Tank.

Legacy 
In the late 1960s, novelist Bora Ćosić published the first reprints of Dada Tank and Dada Jazz in the Neo-avantgarde pro-Fluxus magazine Rok.

References

Sources 
 

1922 establishments in Yugoslavia
1922 disestablishments in Yugoslavia
Defunct literary magazines published in Europe
Defunct magazines published in Yugoslavia
Serbian-language magazines
Magazines established in 1922
Magazines disestablished in 1922